Dei verbum, the Second Vatican Council's Dogmatic Constitution on Divine Revelation, was promulgated by Pope Paul VI on 18 November 1965, following approval by the assembled bishops by a vote of 2,344 to 6. It is one of the principal documents of the Second Vatican Council.

The phrase "Dei verbum" is Latin for "Word of God" and is taken from the first line of the document, as is customary for titles of major Catholic documents.

Contents

Concerning sacred Tradition and sacred Scripture
In Chapter II under the heading "Handing On Divine Revelation" the Constitution states among other points:

Hence there exists a close connection and communication between sacred Tradition and sacred Scripture. For both of them, flowing from the same divine wellspring, in a certain way merge into a unity and tend toward the same end. For Sacred Scripture is the word of God inasmuch as it is consigned to writing under the inspiration of the divine Spirit, while sacred tradition takes the word of God entrusted by Christ the Lord and the Holy Spirit to the Apostles, and hands it on to their successors in its full purity, so that led by the light of the Spirit of truth, they may in proclaiming it preserve this word of God faithfully, explain it, and make it more widely known. Consequently it is not from Sacred Scripture alone that the Church draws her certainty about everything which has been revealed. Therefore both sacred tradition and Sacred Scripture are to be accepted and venerated with the same sense of loyalty and reverence. 

The Word of God is transmitted both through the canonical texts of Sacred Scripture, and through Sacred Tradition, which includes various forms such as liturgy, prayers, and the teachings of the Apostles and their successors. The Church looks to Tradition as a protection against errors that could arise from private interpretation.

Concerning the inspiration and interpretation of sacred Scripture

The teaching of the Magisterium on the interpretation of Scripture was summarized in DV 12, expressly devoted to biblical interpretation. Dei Verbum distinguished between two levels of meaning, the literal sense intended by the biblical writers and the further understanding that may be attained due to context within the whole of Scripture.

The Old Testament (14–16)

In Chapter IV, Dei Verbum affirms the saying of Augustine that "the New Testament is hidden in the Old, and that the Old Testament is manifest in the New" (DV 16).

Sacred Scripture in the Life of the Church
"Easy access to Sacred Scripture should be provided for all the Christian faithful." To this end the Church sees to it that suitable and correct translations are made into different languages, especially from the original texts of the sacred books. Frequent reading of the divine Scriptures is encouraged for all the Christian faithful, and prayer should accompany the reading of Sacred Scripture, "so that God and man may talk together". Some are ordained to preach the Word, while others reveal Christ in the way they live and interact in the world.

Scholarly opinion

The schema, or draft document, prepared for the first council session (October–December 1962) reflected the conservative theology of the Holy Office under Cardinal Ottaviani. Pope John intervened directly to promote instead the preparation of a new draft which was assigned to a mixed commission of conservatives and progressives, and it was this on which the final document was based. The final draft was significantly influenced by the work of Dominican theologian Yves Congar, who had been appointed a peritus (expert advisor) at the council.

Joseph Ratzinger, later Pope Benedict XVI, identified three overall themes in Dei verbum: (1) the new view of the phenomenon of tradition; (2) the theological problem of the application of critical historical methods to the interpretation of Scripture; and (3) the biblical movement that had been growing from the turn of the twentieth century.

Regarding article 1 of the preface of Dei verbum, Ratzinger wrote: "The brief form of the Preface and the barely concealed illogicalities that it contains betray clearly the confusion from which it has emerged."

Biblical infallibility and inerrancy

The Catechism states that "the books of Scripture firmly, faithfully, and without error teach that truth which God, for the sake of our salvation, wished to see confided to the Sacred Scriptures."

Nevertheless, the Catechism clearly states that "the Christian faith is not a 'religion of the book.' Christianity is the religion of the 'Word' of God, a word which is 'not a written and mute word, but the Word is incarnate and living'. If the Scriptures are not to remain a dead letter, Christ, the eternal Word of the living God, must, through the Holy Spirit, 'open [our] minds to understand the Scriptures.'"

The Catechism goes on to state that "In Sacred Scripture, God speaks to man in a human way. To interpret Scripture correctly, the reader must be attentive to what the human authors truly wanted to affirm, and to what God wanted to reveal to us by their words."

"But since Sacred Scripture is inspired, there is another and no less important principle of correct interpretation, without which Scripture would remain a dead letter. 'Sacred Scripture must be read and interpreted in the light of the same Spirit by whom it was written.'"

There was a controversy during the Council on whether the Roman Catholic Church taught biblical infallibility or biblical inerrancy. Some have interpreted Dei verbum as teaching the infallibility position, while others note that the conciliar document often quotes previous documents such as Providentissimus Deus and Divino afflante Spiritu that suggest inerrancy.

See also 
 Divino afflante Spiritu
 Verbum Domini

Footnotes

Works cited

Commentary on the Documents of Vatican II, volume III, edited by Herbert Vorgrimler, chapter on the Dogmatic Constitution on Divine Revelation, written by Joseph Ratzinger, Aloys Grillmeier, and Béda Rigaux, Herder and Herder, New York, 1969.

Further reading
The Gift of Scripture, "Published as a teaching document of the Bishops' Conferences of England, Wales and Scotland" (2005), The Catholic Truth Society, Ref. SC 80, .
Scripture: Dei Verbum (Rediscovering Vatican II), by Ronald D. Witherup, .
 
 
 Witherup, Ronald D., The Word of God at Vatican II: Exploring Dei Verbum, Collegeville, Minnesota: Liturgical Press, 2014.

Further reading 

Arthur Wells, Bishop Christopher Butler OSB – His Rôle in Dei Verbum, Part 1 – Part 2
Bernard Orchard OSB, Dei Verbum and the Synoptic Gospels (1990)
Brian W. Harrison, O.S., On Rewriting the Bible (2002)

External links
Dogmatic Constitution on Divine Revelation – Dei verbum (English translation on the Vatican website)

Documents of the Second Vatican Council
Latin texts
1965 documents
1965 in Christianity